David Alan Faber (born October 21, 1942) is a senior United States district judge of the United States District Court for the Southern District of West Virginia.

Education and career

Born in Charleston, West Virginia, Faber graduated from Sissonville High School and received an Artium Baccalaureus degree from West Virginia University in 1964 and a Juris Doctor from Yale Law School in 1967. He was in private practice in Charleston from 1967 to 1968. He was in the United States Air Force, JAG Corps from 1968 to 1972, and was then in the United States Naval Reserve from 1973 to 1977. He returned to private practice in Charleston from 1972 to 1981, and was in the West Virginia Air National Guard from 1978 to 1992. He was the United States Attorney for the Southern District of West Virginia from 1981 to 1986, again returning to private practice in Charleston from 1987 to 1991, also serving as a special part-time Assistant United States Attorney for the Northern District of West Virginia from 1988 to 1990. Judge Faber earned his Ph.D. in history from the University of Cambridge.  He earned his LLM from the University of Virginia.

Federal judicial service

On August 1, 1991, Faber was nominated by President George H. W. Bush to a new seat on the United States District Court for the Southern District of West Virginia created by 104 Stat. 5089. He was confirmed by the United States Senate on November 21, 1991, and received his commission on November 25, 1991. He served as Chief Judge from 2002 to 2007, assuming senior status on December 31, 2008.  Judge Faber sits by designation on the United States Court of Appeals for the Fourth Circuit and the United States Court of Appeals for the Ninth Circuit.

Among Judge Faber's most notable  opinions is his separate opinion (concurring in part and concurring in the judgment) in the disparate-impact liability case Hardie v. NCAA, 2017 WL 2766096 (9th Cir. 2017), discussing how classifications based only on race should be scrutinized carefully in the disparate-impact liability context.

References

Sources
 

1942 births
20th-century American lawyers
Living people
United States Attorneys for the Southern District of West Virginia
Judges of the United States District Court for the Southern District of West Virginia
United States district court judges appointed by George H. W. Bush
20th-century American judges
Lawyers from Charleston, West Virginia
Military personnel from Charleston, West Virginia
West Virginia University alumni
Yale Law School alumni
West Virginia lawyers
United States Air Force officers
United States Navy officers
West Virginia National Guard personnel
Assistant United States Attorneys
21st-century American judges